Karl or Carl Elsener may refer to:
Karl Elsener (footballer) (1934–2010), Swiss football goalkeeper
Karl Elsener (inventor) (1860–1918), inventor of the Swiss Army knife
Carl Elsener Sr. (1922–2013), entrepreneur, nephew of the inventor